Yakov Grigoryevich Tolstikov (born 20 May 1959 in Prokopyevsk) is a former Russian distance runner. Tolstivov rose to worldwide prominence following his surprise upset of favorite Gelindo Bordin in the 1991 London Marathon. He set a personal best of 2:09:17 hours at the race which went unbeaten as a Soviet record. This time was the fastest by any European in the 1991 season, and the third fastest time in the world after Kōichi Morishita and Takeyuki Nakayama of Japan.

In international competition he represented the Unified Team at the 1992 Summer Olympics in Barcelona, Spain, coming in a distant 22nd. He twice ran at the World Championships in Athletics, coming eleventh in 1987 but failing to finish in 1991. He was a marathon bronze medallist at the 1986 Goodwill Games.

In individual races, he won the Uzhhorod Marathon three times (1983, 1986, 1987), the 1984 Moscow International Peace Marathon, the 1995 Siberian International Marathon, and the 1990 Humarathon. He was a one-time national champion, winning the marathon at the Soviet Athletics Championships in 1988.

International competitions

Marathons

 The Friendship Games Marathon was hosted within the Moscow International Peace Marathon in 1984 and Tolstikov was the second fastest runner there, but did not receive a Friendship Games medal as he was not entered for the team.

References

External links
 

1959 births
Living people
People from Prokopyevsk
Sportspeople from Kemerovo Oblast
Russian male long-distance runners
Russian male marathon runners
Olympic athletes of the Unified Team
Athletes (track and field) at the 1992 Summer Olympics
World Athletics Championships athletes for the Soviet Union
Goodwill Games medalists in athletics
London Marathon male winners
Competitors at the 1986 Goodwill Games
Soviet male marathon runners